The 1998 IPB Czech Indoor was a men's tennis tournament played on indoor carpet courts in Ostrava, Czech Republic that was part of the World Series of the 1998 ATP Tour. It was the fifth edition of the tournament and was held from 19 October until 25 October 1998. Second-seeded Andre Agassi won the singles title.

Finals

Singles

 Andre Agassi defeated  Ján Krošlák, 6–2, 3–6, 6–3
 It was Agassi's 5th singles title of the year and the 39th of his career.

Doubles

 Nicolas Kiefer /  David Prinosil defeated  David Adams /  Pavel Vízner, 6–4, 6–3.

References

External links
 ITF tournament edition details

IPB Czech Indoor
Ostrava Open
1998 in Czech tennis